Zarand is a city and capital of Zarand County, Kerman Province, Iran.  At the 2006 census, its population was 54,745, in 12,992 families.

On February 22, 2005, a major earthquake killed hundreds of residents in the city of Zarand and several nearby villages in north Kerman. (See 2005 Zarand earthquake.)

Southwest of Tehran, Iran, halfway between Tehran and Saveh, there is a plain also called Zarand. Zavyeh and Mamounieh are two small towns on this plain.

A crater on Mars is named after this city.

References

Populated places in Zarand County
Cities in Kerman Province